Seagram was a Canadian alcoholic beverages company.

Seagram or Seagram's or variation, may also refer to:

People
Seagram (rapper), an American rapper

People with the surname
Barbara Seagram (born 1949), Barbadian-Canadian contract-bridge cardgame authority
Edward F. Seagram (1873–1937), Canadian politician and businessman, son of distiller Joseph Emm Seagram
Henry Froude Seagram (1802–1843), Governor of Gambia
Joseph E. Seagram (1841–1919), Canadian businessman, politician and racehorse owner, the namesake of the Seagram company
Lisa Seagram (1936–2019), U.S. actress

Facilities and structures
Seagram House, a historic building and former HQ of Seagram in Montreal, Quebec
Seagram Building, a skyscraper in Manhattan, New York City
Seagram Museum, a museum in Waterloo, Ontario that records the history of the Canadian company, formerly the Waterloo Distillery, formerly the original Seagram Distillery
Seagram's Distillery, a historically significant building complex in Louisville, Kentucky

Other uses
Seagram (racehorse), a New Zealand foaled racehorse
Rochester Seagrams, a former name of the Sacramento Kings, an American basketball team

See also

Seagram Stables, a Canadian Thoroughbred horse racing operation
Seagram Cup Stakes, a Canadian graded stakes race inaugurated in 1903
Seagram's Seven Crown, an American blended whiskey

SEGRAM